Adesar railway station is a railway station in Kutch district, Gujarat, India on the Western line of the Western Railway network. One Passenger, one Express and one Superfast trains halt here.

Nearby stations

Bhutakiya Bhimasar is nearest railway station towards , whereas Lakhpat is nearest railway station towards .

Major trains

Following Express and Superfast trains halt at Adesar railway station:

 12959/60 Dadar–Bhuj Superfast Express
 19151/52 Palanpur–Bhuj Intercity Express

References 

Railway stations in Kutch district
Ahmedabad railway division
Transport in Bhuj